Lord Kirkcudbright was a title in the Peerage of Scotland. It was created for Sir Robert Maclellan of Bombie on a 1633 royal visit to Scotland by King Charles I of England. Maclellan had already been created a baronet of Nova Scotia in 1631.

Sir John (Maclellan) de Bondeby was with Scottish the independence leader Sir William Wallace in the year of 1298, during the battle of Falkirk, after which he sailed with Wallace from Kirkcudbright for France, to seek the support of King Philip IV, in his struggle against Edward I of England.

This name is said to have derived from 'son or servant of Gillie', of St. Fillan, or "Mac Gille Fhaolain." Fillan or "faelchu", is old Irish for wolf. The Maclellan Motto: "Think on."

The MacLellan family was numerous in Galloway in the later half of the 14th Century and gave its name to Balmaclellan, MacLellan's town, in the Stewartry of Galloway. It is understood that the Balmaclellan lands were given to John MacLellan by James III, king of Scotland, in 1466 on John MacLellan's intention to provide a site for a church there abouts. By the beginning of the fifteenth century there were no fewer than fourteen knights of that name then living in Galloway.

Consequent upon, and sometime after the murder of Sir Patrick Maclellan by the 8th Earl of Douglas at his stronghold of Threave in 1452, family feuding without the King's authority led to the forfeiture of the Maclellan Barony of Bomby, along with other collateral estates.  Not long afterwards however in 1455 some Bombie lands were recovered, when King James II, of Scotland, with support from the Maclellans, undertook the siege of Threave Castle, and won a victory over the 'Black Douglas' clan.

Lords Kirkcudbright (1633)
Robert Maclellan, 1st Lord Kirkcudbright (d. 1641)
Thomas Maclellan, 2nd Lord Kirkcudbright (d. 1647)
John Maclellan, 3rd Lord Kirkcudbright (d. 1664)
William Maclellan, 4th Lord Kirkcudbright (d. 1669)
John Maclellan, 5th Lord Kirkcudbright (d. 1678)
James Maclellan, 6th Lord Kirkcudbright (1661–1730)
William Maclellan, 7th Lord Kirkcudbright (d. 1762)
John Maclellan, 8th Lord Kirkcudbright (1729–1801)
Sholto Henry Maclellan, 9th Lord Kirkcudbright (1771–1827)
Camden Gray Maclellan, 10th Lord Kirkcudbright (1774–1832) (dormant)

See also
Kirkcudbrightshire

References

Kirkcudbright
Kirkcudbright